Senhor Testiculo (English: Mister Testicles, or Mr. Balls) is the mascot for the Association of Personal Assistance for Cancer (Associação de Assistência às Pessoas), based in Viçosa, Minas Gerais, Brazil.  The mascot is a large pair of testicles.  The non-profit organization Senhor Testiculo represents describes the mascot as "a friendly snowman in the shape of testicle".

References

Testicle
Mascots introduced in 2013
Male characters in advertising